Satellite Award for Best Supporting Actress may refer to:

Satellite Award for Best Supporting Actress - Motion Picture
Satellite Award for Best Supporting Actress - Series, Miniseries or Television Film